The Warburg diffusion element is an equivalent electrical circuit component that models the diffusion process in dielectric spectroscopy. That element is named after German physicist Emil Warburg.

A Warburg impedance element can be difficult to recognize because it is nearly always associated with a charge-transfer resistance (see charge transfer complex) and a double-layer capacitance, but is common in many systems. The presence of the Warburg element can be recognised if a linear relationship on the log of a Bode plot ( vs. ) exists with a slope of value –1/2.

General equation 

The Warburg diffusion element is a constant phase element (CPE), with a constant phase of 45° (phase independent of frequency) and with a magnitude inversely proportional to the square root of the frequency by:

where 
 is the Warburg coefficient (or Warburg constant); 
 is the imaginary unit;
 is the angular frequency.

This equation assumes semi-infinite linear diffusion, that is, unrestricted diffusion to a large planar electrode.

Finite-length Warburg element 

If the thickness of the diffusion layer is known, the finite-length Warburg element is defined as:

where 

There are two special conditions of finite-length Warburg elements: the Warburg Short for a transmissive boundary, and the Warburg Open for a reflective boundary.

Warburg Short (WS) 

This element describes the impedance of a finite-length diffusion with transmissive boundary. It is described by the following equation:

Warburg Open (WO) 

This element describes the impedance of a finite-length diffusion with reflective boundary. It is described by the following equation:

References

Electrochemistry